The 2020–21 Nebraska Cornhuskers men's basketball team represented the University of Nebraska in the 2020–21 NCAA Division I men's basketball season. The Cornhuskers were led by second-year coach head coach Fred Hoiberg and played their home games at Pinnacle Bank Arena in Lincoln, Nebraska as members of the Big Ten Conference.

Previous season
They finished the 2019–20 season 7–25, 2–18 in Big Ten play to finish in last place. They lost to Indiana in the first round of the Big Ten tournament which was subsequently canceled due to the coronavirus pandemic.

Departures

Incoming transfers

2020 recruiting class

Roster

Schedule and results

|-
!colspan=9 style=|Non-conference season

|-
!colspan=9 style=|Big Ten season

|-
!colspan=9 style=|Big Ten tournament

Schedule source:

References

Nebraska Cornhuskers men's basketball seasons
Nebraska
Nebraska
Nebraska